The TSV 1861 Nördlingen is a German football club in the town of Nördlingen, Schwaben, formed in 1861. It plays its home games at the Gerd-Müller-Stadion which has a capacity of 10,000 spectators. Apart from football, the club offers 14 other sports departments, the most successful by far being the basketball-department which currently has a men's and women's team in the 2. Basketball Bundesliga (II).

Basketball

The club has two very successful basketball teams, the men's team now named Giants Nördlingen and the women's WWK Donau-Ries Nördlingen. Both the men's and women's team played in the 2. Basketball Bundesliga in 2008.  The women's team belonged to the Basketball-Bundesliga for many years from 1989 before voluntarily withdrawing to the second division.  The men's team won the Basketball-Regionalliga South-East (III) in 2003 and played in the 2. Bundesliga-Süd (II) which now is called 2. Bundesliga Pro-A until 2008, when the team achieved promotion to the Basketball Bundesliga. Once before, in the 1972–73 season, did the team reach this level, to finish last out of eight teams in the southern group of the Bundesliga and to be imideatelly relegated.

The 2007–08 season was by far the most successful in the club's basketball history. Both the men's and women's senior teams won their league and earning promotion, with the women being especially dominant, winning 21 out of their 22 games, with a 63–72 defeat at home to ASC Theresianum Mainz being the only loss of the season. The men's team won the league championship on the strength of a 17-game winning streak, lasting until the end of the season. Both teams are eligible for Bundesliga promotion.

Men's seasons (selection):

 1972–73 Bundesliga-Süd 8th (relegated)
 2002–03 Regionalliga Südost 1st (promoted)
 2003–04 2. Bundesliga-Süd 14th
 2004–05 2. Bundesliga-Süd 10th
 2005–06 2. Bundesliga-Süd 8th
 2006–07 2. Bundesliga-Süd 9th
 2007–08 2. Bundesliga Pro-A 1st (promoted)
 2008–09 Basketball Bundesliga

Women's seasons (selection):

 1987–88 2. Bundesliga-Süd 2nd
 1988–89 2. Bundesliga-Süd 1st (promoted)
 1989–90 Basketball Bundesliga 7th
 1990–91 Basketball Bundesliga 10th
 2007–08 2. Bundesliga-Süd 1st (promoted)
 2008–09 Basketball Bundesliga

Football

The club was promoted in 1959 to the 2. Amateurliga Schwaben (IV), where it spent the next three seasons until the reorganisation of German football in 1963. The TSV was grouped in the Bezirksliga (V) Schwaben, which it managed to win in its first season, thanks to the goal scoring efforts of a young talent with the name of Gerd Müller. Promotion to the Landesliga Bayern-Süd (IV) was achieved and the club spent three seasons in the league until they were relegated back to the Bezirksliga in 1967. The Bezirksliga Schwaben was split into a northern and a southern section in 1968 and the TSV entered the Bezirksliga Schwaben-Nord, where it stayed until 1974.

With the Bezirksliga championship in 1974, the club returned to the Landesliga once more and survived 11 seasons in the league until relegated once again in 1985, back to the Bezirksliga Nord. It began the golden age of the club with five top-four finishes in the Landesliga until 1979 its first Schwaben Cup win in 1981.  After 1983, the club fell into decline.  In 1988, the Bezirksoberliga Schwaben was introduced and TSV Nördlingen managed to qualify, remaining in this league till 1992. From 1992 till 1997 and again in 2002, the club played in the Landesliga Süd, in between were stints in the Bezirksoberliga.

In 2004, the club won another promotion to the Landesliga and remained in this league until the 2007–08 season, when relegation once more could not be avoided. At the end of the 2011–12 season the club qualified directly for the newly expanded Landesliga after finishing third in the Bezirksoberliga. The club's greatest success in the Landesliga came in 2013–14 when it finished runners-up in the league but missed out on promotion in the promotion round.

The club's youth teams are traditionally quite strong; its under-19 side (German:A-Junioren) played in the Bayernliga-Süd, the highest level in Bavaria. Before the introduction of the Under 19 Bundesliga and Regionalliga the TSV used to face the youth sides of FC Bayern and TSV 1860 Munich in the Bayernliga-Süd.

All in all, the TSV 1861 Nördlingen is a very stable and solid club, having played now for almost 50 years either in the Landesliga Süd or the highest Schwaben league, be this the Bezirksliga, Bezirksoberliga or 2. Amateurliga.  While some clubs in the Bezirk Schwaben achieved higher, they also tended to fall deeper.

The club does not have a true local rival as no other club in the Donau-Ries Kreis had similar success.  In the early 2000s the TSV Wemding, based approximately 15 km away, spent a few seasons in the Bezirksoberliga with the TSV and this local derby attracted reasonable crowds.

Famous player
Gerd Müller, born in Nördlingen, played in his early days for the club, until 1964, when FC Bayern Munich signed him. Even then his goal scoring abilities were already very visible with 50 goals scored in his last season with Nördlingen.

Stadium
The club plays its home games at the Gerd-Müller-Stadion. The stadium was renamed in honor of him on 19 July 2008. Until then, it carried the name Rieser Sportpark.

Honours
The club's honours:

League
 Landesliga Bayern-Südwest (VI)
 Runners-up: 2014
 Bezirksliga Schwaben (V)
 Champions: 1964
 Bezirksoberliga Schwaben (V-VI)
 Champions: (2) 1992, 2001
 Bezirksliga Schwaben-Nord (V)
 Champions: 1974

Cup
 Schwaben Cup
 Winners: (3) 1981, 1989, 2007
 Runners-up: (3) 1982, 1990, 2003

Indoor
 Schwaben indoor football championship
 Winners: 1996

Youth
 Bavarian Under 15 championship
 Runners-up: 1990

Recent seasons
The recent season-by-season performance of the club:

With the introduction of the Bezirksoberligas in 1988 as the new fifth tier, below the Landesligas, all leagues below dropped one tier. With the introduction of the Regionalligas in 1994 and the 3. Liga in 2008 as the new third tier, below the 2. Bundesliga, all leagues below dropped one tier. With the establishment of the Regionalliga Bayern as the new fourth tier in Bavaria in 2012 the Bayernliga was split into a northern and a southern division, the number of Landesligas expanded from three to five and the Bezirksoberligas abolished. All leagues from the Bezirksligas onwards were elevated one tier.

DFB Cup appearances
The club has qualified for the first round of the German Cup just once:

Source:

References

External links
 Das deutsche Fußball-Archiv historical German domestic league tables 
 Bavarian amateure leagues: Tables and results
 TSV Nördlingen website
 TSV Nördlingen-Basketball website

Football clubs in Germany
Football clubs in Bavaria
Basketball teams in Germany
Sports clubs established in 1861
Football in Swabia (Bavaria)
1861 establishments in Bavaria
Association football clubs established in 1938
Nördlingen